George Sanderson (February 25, 1810 – April 1, 1886) was an American politician who served as a Whig member of the Pennsylvania State Senate for the 17th district from 1851 to 1854 and as the tenth mayor of Lancaster, Pennsylvania from 1859 to 1868.

Early life
Sanderson was born in Boston, Massachusetts and received his education at the Boston Latin School. He worked in merchandising in New York City, New York prior to his relocation to Geneva, New York.

Following his marriage to Marion Kingsbury, he relocated with her to Towanda, Pennsylvania. He studied law and served as District Attorney for six years before resigning to work in private business.

Career
He was elected to the Pennsylvania State Senate for the 17th district and served from 1851 to 1854.  He befriended Colonel George W. Scranton in 1853 and became one of the founders of Scranton, Pennsylvania.

As mayor of Lancaster, Pennsylvania, Sanderson formed the Lancaster City Police force in 1865.

He died at his home in Green Ridge, Scranton on April 1, 1886 and was interred at Forest Hill Cemetery in Dunmore, Pennsylvania.

References

External links
 

|-

1810 births
1886 deaths
19th-century American politicians
Boston Latin School alumni
Burials in Pennsylvania
County district attorneys in Pennsylvania
Mayors of Lancaster, Pennsylvania
Pennsylvania lawyers
Pennsylvania state senators
Pennsylvania Whigs
Politicians from Boston
19th-century American lawyers